Frank Mantooth (April 11, 1947 in Tulsa, Oklahoma – January 30, 2004 in Garden City, Kansas) was an American jazz pianist and arranger.

Mantooth attended University of North Texas College of Music, graduating in 1969, then played in and arranged for the Air Force Academy Falconaires from 1969 to 1973. He spent the rest of the 1970s living in Austria, where he published arrangements for big bands and small ensembles.

After his return to the U.S. in 1980, Mantooth worked as a pedagogue, arranger, and publisher in addition to performing. He taught at DePaul University and recorded with Phil Wilson, Ashley Alexander, and Kirsten Gustafson. He wrote music for Louie Bellson, Art Farmer, and Carla Helmbrecht. In 2004 he died from a heart attack at the age of 56 at his home in Garden City, Kansas.

Discography
 Our First (Fontana, 1978)
 Suite Tooth (Optimism, 1989)
 Persevere (Optimism, 1990)
 Dangerous Precedent (Sea Breeze, 1993)
 Sophisticated Lady (Sea Breeze, 1995)
 A Miracle (Sea Breeze, 1999)
 Ladies Sing for Lovers (MCG Jazz, 2005)

With Ashley Alexander
 Ashley Alexander Plays Frank Mantooth (AM-PM, 1982)
 Powerslide (Pausa, 1985)
 Seems Like Old Times (Chase, 1987)

Publications 
Voicings for Jazz Keyboard

References

 Scott Yanow, [ Frank Mantooth] at Allmusic
 Obituary, Lawrence Journal-World, p. 8B, February 1, 2004
 Obituary, The Los Angeles Times, February 2, 2004

External links
 Frank Mantooth website

1947 births
2004 deaths
Musicians from Tulsa, Oklahoma
Jazz musicians from Oklahoma
20th-century American male musicians
20th-century American pianists
American jazz pianists
American male pianists
DePaul University faculty
American male jazz musicians
Optimism Records artists
United States Air Force Academy people
University of North Texas College of Music alumni